is located in Mito City, Ibaraki Prefecture, Japan and was established in 1966 as Tokiwagakuen Junior College.

External links
 Official website 

Japanese junior colleges
Universities and colleges in Ibaraki Prefecture